Titan, also known as Manus, is an East Manus language of the Austronesian language family spoken in the southeastern part of Manus Island, New Guinea, and neighboring islands by about 4,000 people.

Titan has a bilabial trill and prenasalized consonants, as in  'girls' and  'wooden plate'.

Phonology 
Phonology of the Titan language:

Consonant sounds in parentheses are only inferred to exist in Titan, or to exist in other dialects of Titan.

An /e/ sound may also be interchangeable with an open-mid sound /ɛ/.

References

Further reading 
 Bowern, Claire (2011). Sivisa Titan: Sketch grammar, texts, vocabulary based on material collected by P. Josef Meier and Po Minis. Oceanic Linguistics Special Publication No. 38. Honolulu: University of Hawai‘i Press.
 Ladefoged, Peter (2005). Vowels and Consonants (2nd ed.) Blackwell.

External links 
 Kaipuleohone's collection of Robert Blust's field materials include audio recordings and written materials for Titan
 Paradisec has a number of collections with Titan language materials.

Manus languages
Languages of Manus Province